Peter Van Rompuy (born 5 March 1980) is a Belgian politician. He is the leader of the CD&V in the Flemish Parliament. On February 6, 2019 he became group leader of the CD&V in the Flemish Parliament, following the appointment of Koen Van den Heuvel to the Flemish government.

Personal life 
His father is former Prime Minister Herman Van Rompuy.

References 

Living people
1980 births
Christian Democratic and Flemish politicians
Members of the Flemish Parliament
21st-century Belgian politicians
Belgian senators of the 56th legislature
Belgian senators of the 57th legislature
KU Leuven alumni